The 43rd International Film Festival of India was held on 20 to 30 November 2012 in Goa. The Guest of Honour was Australian Director Paul Cox. Veteran actor Nandamuri Balakrishna was the chief guest for the edition, and Bollywood actor Akshay Kumar inaugurated the festival. Shankar Mohan served as the festival director.

Winners
Golden Peacock (Best Film): Anhey Ghore Da Daan by Gurvinder Singh
IFFI Best Director Award: Jeon Kyu-hwan for "[[The Weight (film)|The Weight]]"
IFFI Best Actor Award (Male): Silver Peacock Award:  Marcin Dorociński for Rose
IFFI Best Actor Award (Female): Silver Peacock Award: Anjali Patil for Oba Nathuwa Oba Ekka''
Silver Peacock Special Jury Award: Lucy Mulloy for Una Noche

Special Awards
Life Time Achievement Award - Krzysztof Zanussi
Centenary Award - Meera Nair for The Reluctant Fundamentalist

Official selections

Special screenings

Opening film
Life of Pi by Ang Lee

Closing film
The Reluctant Fundamentalist by Meera Nair

References

External links
 

2012 film festivals
2012 festivals in Asia
International Film Festival of India
2012 in Indian cinema